Sadun-e Do (also Romanized as Sa‘dūn-e Do) is a village in Bani Saleh Rural District, Neysan District, Hoveyzeh County, Khuzestan Province, Iran. At the 2006 census, its population was 245, with 53 families.

References 

Populated places in Hoveyzeh County